The 2020–21 Swiss Super League (referred to as the Raiffeisen Super League for sponsoring reasons) was the 124th season of top-tier competitive football in Switzerland and the 18th under its current name and format.

A total of ten teams competed in the league: the eight best teams from the 2019–20 season, the 2019–20 Swiss Challenge League champions Lausanne-Sport and relegation play-off winners Vaduz. Young Boys were the three-time defending champions, and successfully defended their title.

Teams

Stadia and locations

Personnel and kits

Managerial changes

League table

Results

First and second round

Third and fourth round

Relegation play-offs 
The ninth-placed team of the 2020–21 Swiss Super League, Sion, played against the runners-up of the 2020–21 Swiss Challenge League, Thun.

First leg

Second leg 

Sion won 6–4 on aggregate.

Top scorers

Awards

Annual awards 
Player of the Season

Player of the Season awarded to  Arthur Cabral
(Basel)

Young Player of the Season

Young Player of the Season awarded to
 Kastriot Imeri
(Servette)

Coach of the Season

Coach of the Season awarded to  Gerardo Seoane
(Young Boys)

Goal of the Season

Goal of the Season awarded to
Alexander Gerndt (Lugano)

Team of the Year 

Team of the Year was:

Goalkeeper: David von Ballmoos (Young Boys)
Defence': Silvan Widmer (Basel),  Fabian Lustenberger (Young Boys),  Eray Cömert (Basel), Silvan Hefti
(Young Boys)
Midfield:
 Benjamin Kololli
(Zürich),
 Michel Aebischer
(Young Boys),

Jordi Quintillà (St.Gallen),
 Christian Fassnacht
(Young Boys),

Attack:
 Arthur Cabral (Basel),
 Jean-Pierre Nsame (Young Boys)

Clean sheets

References

External links 
Official website
uefa.com
soccerway.com

Swiss Super League seasons
2020–21 in Swiss football
Swit